Coordination polymerisation is a form of polymerization that is catalyzed by transition metal salts and complexes.

Types of coordination polymerization of alkenes

Heterogeneous Ziegler–Natta polymerization
Coordination polymerization started in the 1950s with heterogeneous Ziegler–Natta catalysts based on titanium tetrachloride and organoaluminium co-catalysts. The mixing of TiCl4 with trialkylaluminium complexes produces Ti(III)-containing solids that catalyze the polymerization of ethene and propene. The nature of the catalytic center has been of intense interest but remains uncertain. Many additives and variations have been reported for the original recipes.

Homogeneous Ziegler–Natta polymerization
In some applications heterogeneous Ziegler–Natta polymerization has been superseded by homogeneous catalysts such as the Kaminsky catalyst discovered in the 1970s. The 1990s brought forward a new range of post-metallocene catalysts. Typical monomers are nonpolar ethene and propene. The development of coordination polymerization that enables copolymerization with polar monomers is more recent. Examples of monomers that can be incorporated are methyl vinyl ketones, methyl acrylate, and acrylonitrile.

Kaminsky catalysts are based on metallocenes of group 4 metals (Ti, Zr, Hf) activated with methylaluminoxane (MAO).
Polymerizations catalysed by metallocenes occur via the Cossee–Arlman mechanism. The active site is usually anionic but cationic coordination polymerization also exists.

Specialty monomers
Many alkenes do not polymerize in the presence of Ziegler–Natta or Kaminsky catalysts. This problem applies to polar olefins such as vinyl chloride, vinyl ethers, and acrylate esters.

Butadiene polymerization
The annual production of polybutadiene is 2.1 million tons (2000). The process employs a neodymium-based homogeneous catalyst.

Principles
Coordination polymerization has a great impact on the physical properties of vinyl polymers such as polyethylene and polypropylene compared to the same polymers prepared by other techniques such as  free-radical polymerization. The polymers tend to be linear and not branched and have much higher molar mass. Coordination type polymers are also stereoregular and can be isotactic or syndiotactic instead of just atactic. This tacticity introduces crystallinity in otherwise amorphous polymers. From these differences in polymerization type the distinction originates between low-density polyethylene (LDPE), high-density polyethylene (HDPE) or even ultra-high-molecular-weight polyethylene (UHMWPE).

Coordination polymerization of other substrates
Coordination polymerization can also be applied to non-alkene substrates. Dehydrogenative coupling of silanes, dihydro- and trihydrosilanes, to polysilanes has been investigated, although the technology has not been commercialized. The process entails coordination and often oxidative addition of Si-H centers to metal complexes.

Lactides also polymerize in the presence of Lewis acidic catalysts to give polylactide:

See also 
 Cossee–Arlman mechanism
 Ziegler–Natta catalyst
 Polymerization
 Coordination bond

References 

Polymerization reactions